Aruz wezni, or aruz prosody, is a kind of Turkic poetic rhythm. The earliest founder of this versification system was Khalil ibn Ahmad. There were 16 kinds of modalities of aruz at first. Later Persian scholars added 3 kinds. For example, the Turki long poem Happiness and Wisdom from the 11th century was written using a modality called "Mutaqallip".

References 

Turkic literature